Leslie Walter Gandar (26 January 1919 – 16 December 1994) was a New Zealand politician of the National Party.

Biography

Early life and career
Gandar was born in 1919. He received his education from Kelburn Normal, Wellington College, and Victoria University, from where he graduated with a BSc. During World War II, he fought for the Royal New Zealand Air Force in Britain, the Middle East, and Iran. He returned to his sheep farm in the Manawatu after the war. He was elected onto Pohangina County Council and served from 1952 to 1969, including ten years as chairman. He had a strong interest in education and was on the Massey University Council from 1963 and was the university's chancellor from 1970 to 1975.

Political career

He was defeated in 1978 for the new Rangitikei electorate by Bruce Beetham. Beetham had won the electorate in the Rangitikei by-election, held earlier in the year on 18 February 1978 after the death of Sir Roy Jack. National planned that Gandar would take over the new electorate at the November general election, and stood an interim candidate, local Jim Bull, in the by-election. But, to general surprise, Beetham won the by-election for Social Credit.

Gandar was a cabinet minister in the Third National Government of New Zealand holding the Education portfolio (1975–1978), and from 1979 to 1982 was the New Zealand High Commissioner to the United Kingdom.

Later life and death
He died on 16 December 1994 in Wellington and was cremated.

Notes

References

|-

New Zealand National Party MPs
Members of the Cabinet of New Zealand
1919 births
1994 deaths
High Commissioners of New Zealand to the United Kingdom
New Zealand MPs for North Island electorates
New Zealand education ministers
Members of the New Zealand House of Representatives
Chancellors of Massey University
Unsuccessful candidates in the 1978 New Zealand general election
New Zealand military personnel of World War II